An artist collective is an initiative that is the result of a group of artists working together, usually under their own management, towards shared aims. The aims of an artist collective can include almost anything that is relevant to the needs of the artist; this can range from purchasing bulk materials, sharing equipment, space or materials, to following shared ideologies, aesthetic and political views or even living and working together as an extended family. Sharing of ownership, risk, benefits, and status is implied, as opposed to other, more common business structures with an explicit hierarchy of ownership such as an association or a company.

Overview
Artist collectives have occurred throughout history, often gathered around central resources, for instance the ancient sculpture workshops at the marble quarries on Milos in Greece and Carrara in Italy. During the French Revolution the Louvre in Paris was occupied as an artist collective.

More traditional artist collectives tend to be smallish groups of two to eight artists who produce work, either collaboratively or as individuals toward exhibiting together in gallery shows or public spaces. Often an artist collective will maintain a collective space, for exhibiting or as workshop or studio facilities. Some newer, more experimental kinds of groups include intentional networks, anonymous, connector, hidden or nested groups, and groups with unconventional time-scales.

Artist collectives may be formed:
 for economic reasons, to give members volume purchasing power and allow costs of publicity and shows to be shared,
 for political reasons, to increase local lobbying power for arts infrastructure, to gather behind a cause or belief,
 for professional reasons, to develop a higher group profile that benefits the individuals by association, to create a hub for curators and commissioners to more easily locate potential talent.

See also
Art group
Musical collective

References

Further reading

External links
 Artist Collectives
 Searchable database of Art Groups and Collective in Canada and the US
  Chicago group Temporary Services webliography of "Groups and Spaces" includes many artists' collectives
 A doctoral study of Exploding Cinema, a London collective of artists and filmmakers